Iglesia de San Juan Bautista (Church of St. John the Baptist) is a Neoclassical church in Chiclana de la Frontera, in the Province of Cádiz, Andalusia, southern Spain.

Construction on an earlier began around 1510, in a slow building process, and was still not completed by 1576. The original church was demolished in the eighteenth century because it was impossible to undertake its expansion, due to its state of ruin. A bas-relief of the altarpiece dated to 1552 by the sculptor Roque Balduque and the  painter Andrés Ramírez were salvaged though.

The architect Torcuato Cayón, then in charge of the works of the new Cádiz Cathedral, and a key figure in the transition from Baroque to neoclassical architecture in this area, was responsible for designing the new church, built from 1776 under his direction until his death in 1783. It was eventually fully completed in 1814.

See also 
 List of Bien de Interés Cultural in the Province of Cádiz

External links
Cadizpedia 

Churches in the Province of Cádiz
Chiclana de la Frontera
Roman Catholic churches completed in 1814
1510 establishments in Spain
19th-century Roman Catholic church buildings in Spain